The Sultanate of Dahlak was a small medieval kingdom covering the Dahlak Archipelago and parts of the Eritrean coast. First attested in 1093, it quickly profited from its location between Mdre Bahri Kingdom and Yemen as well as Egypt and India. After the mid 13th century Dahlak lost its trade monopoly and subsequently started to decline. Both the Ethiopian empire and Yemen tried to enforce their authority over the sultanate. It was eventually annexed by the Ottomans in 1557, who made it part of their Abyssinian province.

History

Origins and early history

After the Umayyads seized Dahlak in 702, they made it a prison and place of forced exile, as did the early Abbasids who succeeded them. By the 9th century the Dahlak islands had come under the rule of the king of Abyssinia. Around 900 he concluded a treaty of friendship with the Ziyadid sultan of Zabid in Yemen, and by the mid 10th century it is recorded that Dahlak was forced to pay tribute to Sultan Ishaq ibn Ibrahim. A century later, Dahlak was involved in a power struggle between the Ziyadids and the Najahids, as the latter had fled to there in 1061. Battles were fought until 1086, when the Najahids managed to restore their rule in Zabid.

The first sultan who is attestable is Sultan Mubarak, whose funerary stele states died in 1093. His dynasty apparently lasted until 1230/1249. It was during this period, the 11th–mid 13th century, that the Sultanate enjoyed its greatest prosperity. This prosperity was mostly based on the monopoly of the external trade of the Ethiopian interior, but also involvement in the transit trade between Egypt and India. It was also through Dahlak that Ethiopia maintained diplomatic relations with Yemen. In the mid 13th century, however, the Zagwe kings began to make use of a new trading route in the south, with the port town Zeila as its final destination. Thus Dahlak lost its trading monopoly. Around the same time, Ibn Sa'id al-Maghribi records that the Dahlak sultans struggled to stay independent from the Rasulids.

From the 12th century the sultans of Dahlak controlled the important trading town of Massawa on the African Red Sea coast, which was governed by a deputy titled the Nai'b. Other coastal settlements on the African continent might have been controlled by the Dahlak sultans as well, at least temporarily. To the Ethiopians, the sultan of Dahlak was known as Seyuma Bahr ("Prefect of the Sea"), in contrast to the Bahr Negash ("Lord of the Sea") of Medri Bahri.

It was shortly after the death of Sultan Mubarak that the Dahlak sultanate began to mint coins, which were used to pay for imported goods such as Egyptian textiles and storax balsam.

The Muslims of Dahlak were probably not successful in proselytizing northern Abyssinia. The Ethiopian Church had been well-established for centuries. Muslims were tolerated only as traders.

Demise 

By the 15th century, the economy of the sultanate was not only in decline, but it was also forced to pay tribute to the emperors of Ethiopia. In 1464–1465, Massawa and the Dahlak archipelago were pillaged by emperor Zara Yaqob. By 1513 Dahlak had become a vassal of the Tahirids. In 1517 and 1520 it came into conflict with the Portuguese empire, resulting in much destruction. By 1526 the Dahalik sultan, Ahmad, had been degraded to a tributary. There was a short revival of the sultanate during the Abyssinian-Adal war, where the sultanate of Adal waged a temporarily successful jihad against the Ethiopian Empire. Sultan Ahmad joined Adal and was rewarded with the port town of Arkiko, which before the war had belonged to Medri Bahri. However, in 1541, one year after the death of sultan Ahmad, the Portuguese returned and destroyed Dahlak yet again. Sixteen years later, the islands were occupied by the Ottoman Empire, who made them part of the Habesh Eyalet. Under the rule of the Ottomans, the Dahlak islands lost their significance.

Dahlak Kebir
Dahlak Kebir, a site on the same-named Dahlak Kebir Island, contains material dating to the era of the sultanate. Nearly 300 tombstones have been discovered. They attest the presence of a cosmopolitan population originating from all over the Islamic world. Several, now deteriorating, qubbas have been noted. The settlement itself consisted of well-built stone houses made of coral. The site also contains several settlement mounds. The medieval population used sophisticated cisterns to ensure a continuous supply of freshwater.

Notes

References
 
 
 
 
 
 
 

Former sultanates in the medieval Horn of Africa
11th-century establishments in Africa
History of Eritrea
Former monarchies